The 1963–64 Cypriot Cup was the 22nd edition of the Cypriot Cup. A total of 7 clubs entered the competition. It began with the first round on 10 June 1964 and concluded on 5 July 1964 with the final which was held at GSP Stadium (1902). Anorthosis won their 1st Cypriot Cup trophy after beating APOEL 3–0 in the final.

Sources

See also
 Cypriot Cup
 1963–64 Cypriot First Division

Cypriot Cup seasons
1963–64 domestic association football cups
1963–64 in Cypriot football